Lunner is a municipality in Viken county, Norway. It is part of the traditional region of Hadeland. The administrative centre of the municipality is the village of Roa. Lunner was established when it was separated from the municipality of Jevnaker on 1 January 1898. From 1 January 2020 the municipality belongs to Viken county, it was Oppland before that.

General information

Name
The municipality (originally the parish) is named after the old Lunner farm (Old Norse: Lunnar), since the first church was built here. The name is the plural form of  "log". (The farm and the church are located on a long hill which was probably compared to a log.)

Coat-of-arms
The coat-of-arms is from modern times. They were granted on 4 April 1986. The arms show a Lily of the Valley, as a symbol for the forests in the area. The Lily of the Valley is a very common flower in the meadows and forests. The flowers also symbolize the eight schools in the municipality.

Geography

Lunner is bordered to the north by the municipality of Gran, to the east by Nannestad, to the south by Nittedal and Oslo, and to the west by Jevnaker. There are several population centers in the municipality. Amongst these are: Harestua, Grua, Roa, and the village of Lunner.

It lies at the southern end of Oppland county. Lakes in the region include Avalsjøen.

Transportation
The Gjøvikbane and Bergensbane railway lines pass through the municipality.

Attractions
 Lunner church
 Hadeland Mining Museum at Grua
 Harestua Solar Observatory, near Piperen
 Kloppstock Music Festival used to be held every summer at Harestua

Notable residents
 Trond Halvorsen Wirstad (1904 in Lunner – 1985) politician, Mayor of Lunner, 1947–1951
 Ivar Ballangrud (1904 in Lunner - 1969), a speed skater, triple gold medalist at the 1936 Winter Olympics
 Josef Monsrud (1922 in Harestua – 2009) a forester and resistance member during WWII
 Jorun Askersrud Nygaard (1929 in Lunner – 2012) a cross-country skier and track and field athlete
 Knut Schreiner (born 1974) stage name "Euroboy" from the punk rock band Turbonegro, grew up in Harestua
 Ivar Rønningen (born 1975 in Lunner) a former footballer with over 200 club caps
 Steinar Strømnes (born 1987 in Roa) a footballer with over 300 club caps

Sister cities
The following cities are twinned with Lunner:
  - Frederikssund, Region Hovedstaden, Denmark
  - Keila, Harju County, Estonia
  - Loppi, Etelä-Suomi, Finland
  - Vetlanda, Jönköping County, Sweden

References

External links

Municipal fact sheet from Statistics Norway

 
Hadeland
Municipalities of Oppland
Municipalities of Viken (county)
Villages in Oppland